These are the results of the men's doubles competition, one of two events for male competitors in table tennis at the 1988 Summer Olympics in Seoul.

Group stage

Group A

Group B

Group C

Group D

Knockout stage

References

External links
 Official Report : Games of the XXIVth Olympiad, Seoul 1988, v.2. Digitally published by the LA84 Foundation.
 1988 Summer Olympics / Table Tennis / Doubles, Men. Olympedia.

Table tennis at the 1988 Summer Olympics
Men's events at the 1988 Summer Olympics